Eulachnesia smaragdina is a species of beetle in the family Cerambycidae. It was described by Bates in 1872. It is known from Panama and Nicaragua.

References

Hemilophini
Beetles described in 1872